The WHL Bantam Draft is an annual outing, in which the teams of the Western Hockey League select players who have graduated from bantam.  The draft's order of selection depends on where the team finishes in the league standings.  The teams that miss the playoffs are placed into a lottery for the 1st round only.  After the 1st round, the teams select in order from fewest to most regular season points.

History
Years ago, WHL teams were allowed to list first-year bantam players as of a set date in September. However, first-year bantams had been playing at the peewee level the previous year, and to list first-year bantams, WHL teams needed to scout the peewee ranks. This had many drawbacks including the need for extensive scouting systems along with the related expense, as well the added pressure on peewee-aged players (12- and 13-year-olds).

To get away from scouting peewees, the WHL instituted a bantam draft. WHL teams send scouts to watch second-year bantams from the start of the minor hockey season. After the season, the WHL holds a draft specifically to allow teams to add bantam players in an orderly manner to their protected lists. While this draft is the first opportunity for teams to select bantam players, it is not the last chance for a player to be listed. After the draft is completed, all the remaining bantams become eligible to be listed by teams, and many will be added as spots become available on team's PPLs, or as a player's talents improve or are more noticeable at a later date or at a higher level of hockey.

During the bantam draft (typically held in early May), players from the four Western Provinces and the states of Alaska, Arizona, California, Colorado, Hawaii, Idaho, Kansas, Minnesota, Montana, Nebraska, Nevada, New Mexico, North Dakota, Oklahoma, Oregon, South Dakota, Texas, Utah, Washington and Wyoming are eligible to be selected.

Players from non-North American countries are allowed to be added in the CHL Import Draft which is held in June.

Protected player list
A team is allowed to add up to 50 players between the ages of 14 and 20 onto its PPL. 14-year-olds may not be added to the list until the Bantam Draft has been completed following their final year at the bantam level.

The 50 Player Protected List is used by the Western Hockey League to ensure there is a method of organization and control in the League for the rights to players. Without this type of built-in control, the system would be problematic.

The 50 Player Protected List works in a very simple manner. Each WHL team is permitted to place a maximum of 50 players between the ages of 14 and 20 on their List. A player may not be added to a WHL List until he has been eligible for the WHL Bantam Draft, which occurs following his final season of bantam hockey.

All players on a WHL team's roster are required to be on the 50 Player Protected List, so if a WHL team is carrying 23 players, this leaves only 27 spots available for future prospects. Needless to say, only the elite players will be represented on a team's List. If a player on the List no longer meets the expectations of the team, he will be replaced by another prospect. As a result, the List is constantly changing as teams evaluate their players and make adjustments. Teams are permitted to make changes to their 50 Player List throughout the entire year.

It is imperative for a team to build their List with quality players if they wish to be competitive in the future. By limiting each team's List to 50 players, this ensures that the talent level will be consistent throughout the WHL, while still rewarding the teams who do the best job in scouting talent.

With only 50 available spots, this means that decisions must be made carefully so as to ensure the team's future viability. Depending on circumstances, a player may be added or removed from a team's List at any time.

Although many players are added to WHL team Lists during the Bantam Draft, there are also numerous situations where players develop later and are listed at that time. The following WHL stars were not selected in the WHL Bantam Draft but were added to a WHL team's list at a later date: Jarome Iginla, Darcy Tucker, Jeff Friesen, Dan Hamhuis, Scottie Upshall, Joffrey Lupul, Jeff Woywitka, Brendan Witt and Shane Doan.

A player who is on a WHL team's List may not play for another WHL team, or attend another WHL team's training camp or rookie camp. However, being a member of a WHL team's 50 Player Protected List does not restrict a player from playing for, or attending a camp of a non-WHL team. The 50 Player Protected List is used strictly to determine which WHL team holds the player's rights.

The WHL, along with the Ontario Hockey League and the Quebec Major Junior Hockey League comprise the Canadian Hockey League. Rules are in place to ensure that a player may be selected by only one league

Recent first overall picks
Key

External links 
 Official website of the Western Hockey League

Ice hockey drafts
Western Hockey League